The Bowlby Baronetcy, of Manchester Square in the Borough of St Marylebone, is a title in the Baronetage of the United Kingdom. It was created on 17 July 1923 for the noted surgeon Anthony Bowlby. His eldest son, the second Baronet, was a Director of GKN. He died without male issue and was succeeded by his nephew, the third Baronet and (as of 2007) present holder of the title. He is the son of the developmental psychologist John Bowlby, second son of the first Baronet.

Bowlby baronets, of Manchester Square (1923)
Sir Anthony Alfred Bowlby, 1st Baronet (1855–1929)
Sir Anthony Hugh Mostyn Bowlby, 2nd Baronet (1906–1993)
Sir Richard Peregrine Longstaff Bowlby, 3rd Baronet (born 1941)

Arms

References

www.thepeerage.com

Bowlby